Posyolok 3-go uchastka instituta imeni Dokuchayeva is a rural locality (a settlement) in Kamenno-Stepnoye Rural Settlement, Talovsky District, Voronezh Oblast, Russia. The population was 359 as of 2010. There are 4 streets.

Geography 
It is located 9 km south of Talovaya (the district's administrative centre) by road. Posyolok 2-go uchastka instituta imeni Dokuchayeva is the nearest rural locality.

References 

Rural localities in Talovsky District